A Touch of Love is a 1915 American silent short drama film directed by Tom Ricketts starring Vivian Rich, Harry Van Meter, and Charlotte Burton.

Cast
 Vivian Rich as Fannie
 Harry Van Meter as Jim
 Charlotte Burton as Martha
 Reaves Eason as Bill
 Jack Richardson as Steve
 Louise Lester

References

External links

1915 films
1915 drama films
Silent American drama films
American silent short films
American black-and-white films
1915 short films
Films directed by Tom Ricketts
1910s American films